The Paradise Bargain is an historical, romance novel by the American writer Betina Krahn.

It is set in 1790s Western Pennsylvania near Pittsburgh against the backdrop of the Whiskey Rebellion. Whitney Daniels prefers buckskin to lace, moccasins to proper shoes, and independence to being hogtied into wedlock. Moreover, the new federal government has sent men to shut down her family's distillery in the fictional Rapture Valley, Pennsylvania. Major Garner Townsend, of the famous Boston Townsends, leads the effort to crush the rebellion, but the frontier lass Whitney captures his heart.

This novel was also re-released under the title Love's Brazen Fire.

1989 American novels
Novels set in Pennsylvania
Fiction set in the 1790s
American romance novels
Zebra Books books